Thomas Cook Aviation GmbH was a German leisure airline launched in 2017 and a technical subsidiary of Condor. It operated scheduled flights exclusively on behalf of Condor to destinations throughout Europe, from its bases in Düsseldorf and Leipzig/Halle. In April 2020, the airline filed for insolvency.

History
The airline was established in October 2017 as Air Berlin Aviation GmbH and was taken over by Thomas Cook Group in 2018 in order to facilitate rapid growth in Germany in the aftermath of the Air Berlin insolvency. On 31 January 2018 the airline received its Air Operator's Certificate (AOC). The company was renamed to Thomas Cook Aviation on 22 November 2018.

Despite the collapse of parent company Thomas Cook Group on 23 September 2019, Thomas Cook Aviation continued its operations together with sister airline Condor. Condor ended the flying contract in spring 2020. In December 2019, the airline received its first Airbus A320, a former aircraft of now-defunct sister airline Thomas Cook Airlines Balearics. In the same month, Condor announced that after separation from the defunct Thomas Cook Group, it would update the livery of its aircraft by removing all references to its former parent company and replace the heart-shaped logo by its own company logo. The planned redesign also included the aircraft of Thomas Cook Aviation.

Thomas Cook Aviation filed for insolvency on 2 April 2020.

Fleet

As of March 2020, the Thomas Cook Aviation fleet consisted of the following aircraft:

References

Defunct airlines of Germany
Airlines established in 2017
Airlines disestablished in 2020
Defunct charter airlines